Adeela Abdullah is an Indian Administrative Service officer (Kerala cadre 2012 batch) and director of the Women and Child Development Department. Adeela also has the additional charge of Gender Park CEO and state lottery department director. First Muslim woman to pass the civil service examination from Malabar of Kerala state. As a medical doctor she worked in the health center at Agali, Mannarkkad.
Adeela then went on to become fisheries director of Kerala and is Managing director of Vizhinjam International Seaport Limited . She is also project director of Kerala Solid Waste Management Project , a world bank funded project

Early life 
Adeela Abdulla was born to Abdulla and Biyyathu. She did her school education from Good Faith School Kuttyadi and MES Raja residential school Chathamangalam. She earned her MBBS from MES medical college Perinthalmanna. She married Dr. Rabeeh from Perinthalmanna. Her Civil Service training was in Delhi, including Hamdard Study Circle.

Career 
After working as a Sub-Collector Trainee in Kannur District, she was appointed Sub-Collector of Tirur in Malappuram Districtand later Subcollector infortKochi.

Controversies 
As the Fort Kochi sub-collector she acted against illegal encroachment worth Rs 60 crore in various parts of the city and began the process of eviction. She attracted the full attention of Kerala. She was transferred to Life Mission Kerala corporation and appointed CEO. A controversy emerged over the contract with Uralungal Labor Contract Co-Operative Society, the sole contractor who had participated for the contract for district-level apartment construction. She refused to give the contract. She then left to give birth to her third child.

References 

Women educators from Kerala
1985 births
Living people
Indian Administrative Service officers